Herbert Lewis Clarke was Archdeacon of Llandaff from 1977 to 1988.

Clarke was born in 1920 and educated at Jesus College, Oxford; and ordained in 1946. After a curacy in Llanelly he was a Lecturer at Wells Theological College, St David's College, Lampeter and Bishop's University, Lennoxville. He was Sub-Warden of St. Michael's College, Llandaff from 1959 to 1967 and then the incumbent at Caerphilly until his appointment as Archdeacon.

References

Alumni of Jesus College, Oxford
1920 births
Archdeacons of Llandaff
Year of death missing
Academic staff of Bishop's University